The Beacon World Tour was a world tour by Northern Irish indie rock band Two Door Cinema Club.

Background
The tour was announced in April 2012 with a date in Paris announced followed by a German tour all of which will take place in November of that year. A show in New York was announced in June, followed by more shows in France. A twenty-one date North American tour was announced for September 2012 and would begin in New York City and end in Santa Ana on October 28. A short intimate tour of the UK and Ireland was announced to showcase the band's new album with the shows taking place in Birmingham, Manchester, London and Dublin in early September thus kicking off the Beacon World Tour. Three festival shows were also announced for Australia, which took place at the end of December and early January 2013. A full UK tour took place in January and February 2013 with dates across the whole of the United Kingdom, the band would also perform their biggest Irish headline show ever in January when they will perform at Dublin's O2. This was set to be Two Door Cinema Club's biggest tour to date. They also performed their biggest show to date at Amsterdam's Heineken Music Hall in March 2013.

Support Act
Guards (Leg 2; North America—select dates)
St. Lucia (Leg 2; North America—select dates)
Bad Veins (Leg 2 & 15; North America;select dates)
Friends (Leg 2; North America)
The Cast of Cheers (Leg 3; Europe—select dates & The O2, Dublin)
Alt-J (Leg 3; Europe—select dates)
Kowalski (Leg 3; Europe—select dates)
The Vaccines (Leg 5; Australia)
The Jungle Giants (Leg 5; Australia)
Bastille (Leg 8; United Kingdom—select dates)
Swim Deep (Leg 8; United Kingdom—select dates)
Richie Egan (Leg 8; Dublin)
Chvrches (Leg 10; United Kingdom)
Everything Everything (Leg 10; London only)
St. Lucia (Leg 15; North America)
Capital Cities (Greek Theatre, Los Angeles)
Peace (Leg 15; North America—select dates)
Swim Deep  (Leg 17; London O2 Arena & Blackpool) 
Crystal Fighters (Leg 17; London O2 Arena) 
Circa Waves  (Leg 17; Blackpool)

Tour dates

 
Festivals and other miscellaneous performances

This show was part of Bestival.
This show was part of Ibiza Rocks.
This show was part of the Austin City Limits Music Festival.
This show was part of the Heineken City Arts Festival.
This show was part of the Festival Les Indisciplines.
This show was part of Live 105's Not So Silent Night.
These shows were part of the Falls Festival.
This show was part of Field Day Sydney.
This show was part of the Southbound Festival.
This show was part of Optimus Alive!.
This show was part of the Low Cost Festival.
This show was part of KROQ Almost Acoustic Christmas.
This show was part of the Sónar Festival.
These shows were part of the Coachella Valley Music and Arts Festival.
This show was part of the Festival Garorock.
This show was part of Rock Werchter.
These shows were part of the Summer Sonic Festival.
This show was part of the Eurockéennes Festival.
This show was part of the Papillons de Nuit Festival.
These shows are part of V Festival.
This show was part of the Osheaga Festival.

This show is part of the Le Cabaret Vert Festival.
This show was part of Lollapalooza Brazil.
This show was part of El Festival Mas Grande.
THis show was part of the Zona Festival.
This show was part of Lollapalooza Chile.
This show was part of the Hultsfred Festival.
TDCC supported The Killers on this date.
This show was part of the Glastonbury Festival 2013.
This show was part of The Days Off Festival.
This show was part of Lollapalooza.
This show was part of The Vieilles Charrues Festival.
This show was part of the Positivus Festival.
This show was part of Radio 1's Big Weekend.
This show was part of the XFM Warcild Concert.
This show was part of Bilbao BBK Live.
This show is part of the Big Festival.
This show was part of SuperSonic.
This show is part of Zurich Openair.
These shows are part of the Coastline Festival.
This show is part of the Urbanscapes Festival.
This show is part of The Electric Picnic Festival.
This show is part of the Clockenflap Festival.

Box office score data

Setlist
This setlist changes order most of the time, except for the two first songs.

"Next Year"
"Undercover Martyn"
"Do You Want It All?"
"This Is The Life"
"Wake Up"
"You're Not Stubborn"
"Spring"
"Sleep Alone"
"Sun"
"Something Good Can Work"
"Beacon" (Live Debut)
"Settle"
"Handshake"
"Eat That Up, It's Good For You"
"What You Know" Encore
"Someday"
"Come Back Home"
"I Can Talk"

External links
Two Door Cinema Club Official Website

References

2012 concert tours
2013 concert tours